MBS International Airport , located in Freeland, Michigan, is a commercial and general aviation airport serving the nearby cities of Midland, Bay City, and Saginaw. It is included in the Federal Aviation Administration (FAA) National Plan of Integrated Airport Systems for 2017–2021, in which it is categorized as a non-hub primary commercial service facility.

MBS was formerly named Tri-City Airport or Freeland Tri-City Airport. The airport was renamed MBS International Airport in 1994 (representative of its IATA airport code) to prevent confusion with other airports named "Tri-City Airport" across the United States. While owned by three municipalities, the IATA and FAA city name associated with the airport is Saginaw, i.e. the control tower is known to pilots as "Saginaw Tower".

The commercial airport is a special municipal body owned by Bay County and the cities of Midland and Saginaw. The airport's name is an initialism formed from the names of these three communities and it is governed by a nine-member commission made up of three members from each of them.

In October 2012, MBS opened a new $55 million six-gate terminal to replace the old three-gate terminal, which was built in 1965. The construction on this project was completed nearly a year ahead of schedule.

The old terminal, which sat empty since October 2012, was demolished in 2017.

MBS International Airport enjoyed a robust 2018 with passenger numbers up 13 percent, and the airport was poised to embark on a major rehabilitation of its main runway to ring in the New Year.

In 2022, a credential authentication technology (CAT) unit was installed at MBS' TSA checkpoint. Passengers insert their ID into the machine themselves, reducing a touchpoint during the security process.

The airport is a sponsor of the Great Lakes Loons, a minor league baseball team affiliated with the Los Angeles Dodgers.

History

During World War II, it was used to hold prisoners of war. Civilian control of the airport resumed in the mid-1940s.

The current terminal on the north side of the air field opened on October 31, 2012.  The  terminal, which replaced an older terminal on the west side of the air field, was designed by RS&H and cost $55 million. The Airport Commission approved plans for the construction of the state-of-the-art passenger terminal in 2006, with construction beginning in 2008.  Airport officials hope the terminal will bring more airlines and more competition to MBS.

Air Force One landed at the airport twice during the 2004 United States Election for nearby rallies in support of George W. Bush. It landed once again on September 10, 2020 for a campaign speech by then  President Donald Trump. (Air Force One also visited the airport in 1974 when then President Richard M. Nixon made a speech at the airport and arrived to give endorsement to James Sparling, a Congressional candidate). Air Force Two also made an appearance in 1992 when Vice President Dan Quayle spoke from a hangar the day before the 1992 presidential election.

Facilities & Aircraft
 Runway 5/23: , surface: asphalt
 Runway 14/32: , surface: asphalt

For the 12-month period ending December 31, 2017, the airport had 20,358 aircraft operations, an average of 77 per day.  For the 12-month period ending December 31, 2021, the airport had 13,500 aircraft operations per day, or 37/day. This 2021 figure includes 67% general aviation, 25% air taxi, 8% commercial, and 1% military.

In December 2017, there were 23 aircraft based at this airport: 11 jet, 7 multi-engine and 5 single-engine airplanes, and 1 helicopter. In 2021, there were 19 aircraft based at the field: 8 jet aircraft, 6 multi-engine and 4 single-engine airplanes, and 1 helicopter.

The airport has an FBO operated by AvFlight. Besides fuel, it offers general maintenance, oxygen, courtesy and rental cars, conference rooms, crew lounges, snooze rooms, showers, and more.

Former airline service

The 1980s and 1990s saw a lot of growth at MBS. During this time, airline service expanded and many airlines began serving MBS.
 Air Canada (Operated by Air Ontario) served MBS with its only International destination, Toronto, Ontario, Canada.
 Allegiant Airlines served MBS in the early 2010s with weekly MD-80 service to Orlando-Sanford, but the route was dropped a few months later when Allegiant announced they would operate from Flint.
 American Eagle Airlines operated Shorts 360 turboprop aircraft to Chicago O'Hare, as well as Lansing, Grand Rapids, Kalamazoo, and Traverse City.  American left MBS in the late 1980s.
 Chicago Express Airlines, the now-defunct ATA Airlines carrier, served MBS in the early 1990s with daily service to Chicago Midway Airport using the Jetstream 31 turboprop aircraft.
 Delta Connection carrier Comair briefly linked MBS with Cincinnati, Ohio using Embraer EMB 120 Brasilia, a 30-seat turboprop. Comair left MBS and started service in Flint.  Delta Connection returned to MBS in 2010 after their merger with Northwest Airlines.
 Continental Airlines provided mainline service in the 1980s to Cleveland, Ohio using McDonnell Douglas DC-9 and Boeing 737 aircraft.  Mainline service was downgraded to Continental Express service in the late 1980s using Beechcraft 1900 turboprop aircraft.  Service to Flint and Chicago Midway also existed in 1992.  The airline left MBS in the mid-1990s and returned in 2002. Service was dropped to Cleveland again in 2003.
Northwest Airlines was a major player at MBS during the late 1980s until their merger with Delta in 2008.  In their 20+ years at MBS, Northwest served Detroit & Minneapolis with a fleet of McDonnell Douglas DC-9 series aircraft along with the Boeing 727 and Airbus 319 & 320. Northwest Airlink linked MBS to Flint, Lansing and Alpena throughout the 1980s with turboprop aircraft and eventually supported mainline Northwest with CRJ service to Detroit, Minneapolis and in 2008, operated a once daily nonstop to New York's LaGuardia Airport in New York City using a CRJ-200 regional jet.
 Republic Airlines began service to MBS in the 1960s linking MBS with Detroit using the DC-9 aircraft. During this time, Republic Express provided turboprop service to Flint, Grand Rapids, and Traverse City.  Republic merged with Northwest Airlines in the 1980s, who subsequently merged with Delta Air Lines in 2010.  Delta still serves MBS today.
 Skyway Airlines (The Midwest Express Connection) served MBS in the 1990s with service to Milwaukee, Wisconsin, using the Beechcraft 1900 turboprop aircraft. Skyway also tried service to Toronto, Flint, and Grand Rapids in the late 1990s. The airline pulled out in the late 1990s.
 United Airlines provided MBS with mainline service since commercial service was started. In the 1980s and 1990s, United linked MBS with Chicago using Boeing 737 and 727 aircraft. Service to Denver, Colorado, also existed in the 1980s.  Mainline United left MBS in the 2001, and was replaced with United Express, which still serves MBS with service to Chicago's O'Hare International Airport using mostly 50-seat aircraft.
 US Airways began service to MBS in 1996, operating Fokker 100 and Boeing 737 aircraft to its former hub in Pittsburgh.  Mainline service ended soon after, and US Airways Express assumed the Pittsburgh flights using the Beech 1900 and Saab 340 aircraft.  US Airways suspended service to MBS just two days after entering Chapter 11 bankruptcy protection in late 2002. At the time it was the only city for US Airways to drop.  Eventually, US Airways also left Flint, Lansing, Kalamazoo, and Grand Rapids, leaving Detroit as the only Michigan destination served by US Airways.

Current operations
SkyWest Airlines runs ground services for United Express. United Express flies to Chicago O’Hare using CRJ-200 aircraft. The CRJ-200 aircraft (flights operated by Air Wisconsin) features 4 Economy Plus seats and 46 Economy seats.

DAL Global Services operates ground handling duties for Delta Connection at MBS, which features both CRJ7 and CRJ9 aircraft. CRJ7 aircraft have 9 First Class, 16 Delta Comfort+, and 44 Main Cabin seats. CRJ9 aircraft have 12 First Class, 20 Delta Comfort+, and 38 Main Cabin seats. Flights are operated by Endeavor Air and occasionally SkyWest.

Airlines and destinations

Passenger

Top destinations

Accidents and incidents
 On April 6, 1958, Vickers Viscount N7437, operating Capital Airlines Flight 67, stalled and crashed on approach. All 47 on board were killed. The cause was attributed to ice accretion on the horizontal stabilizer.
 On August 16, 1987, a Northwest Airlines MD-80, Northwest Airlines Flight 255, originated at MBS.  After departing MBS, the flight dropped off and picked up passengers at Detroit Metropolitan Airport before crashing on takeoff en route to Phoenix, Arizona, killing 148 passengers and six crew members. There was only one survivor.
On May 30, 2016, a Cessna 170 was substantially damaged on landing at MBS International. The pilot reported that after a long straight-in final approach, as he reduced power for the landing flare, the airplane dropped "flat" and bounced hard on the runway. The pilot further reported that he added power to cushion the touchdown after the bounce, but the right main landing gear had collapsed after the initial impact. Subsequently, the airplane veered off the runway to the left and nosed over. The probable cause was found to be the pilot's exceedance of the critical angle of attack during the landing flare, which resulted in an aerodynamic stall, hard landing, right main landing gear collapse, runway excursion, and nose over.

Transportation 
Rental car services are provided by Hertz Rent A Car, Enterprise Rent-A-Car, Avis Car Rental, National Car Rental, and Budget Rent a Car. Various taxi and limousine services are available to passengers as well.

Expansion 
In July 2019, the FAA announced that MBS airport would receive $4.65 million for taxiway construction. This included $1.3 million in entitlement funding and $3.3 million in discretionary funding. The project added a second connection in and out of the terminal ramp, and was projected to improve efficiency.

See also

 Michigan World War II Army Airfields

References

External links

 
 Michigan Bureau of Aeronautics

Airports established in 1943
1943 establishments in Michigan
Airports in Michigan
Airfields of the United States Army Air Forces Technical Service Command
Airfields of the United States Army Air Forces in Michigan
Transportation in Saginaw County, Michigan
Buildings and structures in Saginaw County, Michigan